Kalarm (also Romanized as Kolarm and Kolram; also known as Kalāram) is a village in Sardar-e Jangal Rural District, Sardar-e Jangal District, Fuman County, Gilan Province, Iran. 

At the 2006 census, its population was 945, in 241 families.

Nearby sites include Rudkhan Castle, 23 kilometers away.

References 

Populated places in Fuman County